Myanmar is a unitary republic, with elected representatives at the national and, state or region levels. On the national level, the head of state, the President, is elected indirectly through an Electoral College. According to the 2008 constitution, the term durations of the legislature, the President, and the Cabinet are five years. All elections are regulated by the Union Election Commission.

Voting occurred in all constituencies, excluding seats appointed by the military, to select Members of Assembly to seats in both the upper house (the House of Nationalities) and the lower house (the House of Representatives) of the Assembly of the Union, and State and Region Hluttaws. Ethnic Affairs Ministers were also elected by their designated electorates on the same day, although only select ethnic minorities in particular states and regions were entitled to vote for them.

The country has had 17 general elections since 1922. Following the most recent 2020 elections, in which the National League for Democracy increased its majority, the Tatmadaw, Myanmar's military, claimed the results were invalid. The Tatmadaw deposed democratically elected leaders the day before newly-elected politicians could be sworn in. Democratic elections will not be held until the ongoing state of emergency ends on 1 February 2022. Later it was extended to 1 February 2023.

History
When Ne Win's one party rule system – the Burma Socialist Programme Party (BSPP) – collapsed in August 1988 following the 8888 Uprising, the military staged another coup d'etat the following September, stating that they were going to hold "free and fair" elections in 1990. The first elections to the lower house (the Pyithu Hluttaw or "People's Assembly") under the new military administration, renamed the State Law and Order Restoration Council (SLORC), were held on 27 May 1990.

The major opposition party, the National League for Democracy, won a landslide victory with a majority of 392 out of the 492 seats; thus, under a parliamentary system, the NLD would form a new government. However, the SLORC refused to acknowledge the results, and as a result the People's Assembly never convened.

The military junta placed the leader of the NLD, Aung Sang Suu Kyi, under house arrest following her party's victory. The SLORC was abolished in November 1997 and replaced by the State Peace and Development Council (SPDC), but this was merely a cosmetic change. In August 2003, Prime Minister Khin Nyunt announced a seven-step "roadmap to democracy", which the government claimed it was in the process of implementing. There was no timetable associated with the government’s plan, or any conditionality or independent mechanism for verifying that it is moving forward, so it was greeted sceptically by observers.

On 7 February 2008, SPDC announced that a referendum for the new Constitution would be held, and elections by 2010. The constitutional referendum was held on 10 May. Following this the first general election in 20 years was held in 2010, completing the fifth step of the roadmap to democracy, though the NLD was excluded from participating in it as the Election Commission declared them "null and void" in accordance with election laws. The NLD, were however, allowed to participate in the 2012 by-elections that followed, and Suu Kyi - released from house arrest in 2010 - won a seat in the Pyithu Hluttaw.

In 2015 general election, the National League for Democracy won an absolute majority of seats, taking 86 percent of the seats in the Assembly of the Union well more than the 67 percent supermajority needed to ensure that its preferred candidates will be elected president and first vice president.

Latest elections

House of Nationalities

House of Representatives

Notes

References

External links
Adam Carr's Election Archive
Audio Interview with Mr. Kyaw Zwa Moe, managing editor of Irrawady News Media on Burma and Elections